Hibisceae is a tribe of flowering plants in the mallow family Malvaceae, subfamily Malvoideae.

Genera
The following genera are included:

Abelmoschus Medik.
Anotea (DC.) Kunth
Cenocentrum Gagnep.
Decaschistia Wight & Arn.
Dicellostyles Benth.
Fioria Mattei
Helicteropsis Hochr.
Hibiscadelphus Rock
Hibiscus L.
Humbertianthus Hochr.
Humbertiella Hochr.
Julostylis Thwaites
Kosteletzkya C.Presl
Kydia Roxb.
Macrostelia Hochr.
Malachra L.
Malvaviscus Fabr.
Megistostegium Hochr.
Nayariophyton T.K.Paul
Papuodendron C.T.White
Pavonia Cav.
Peltaea (C.Presl) Standl.
Perrierophytum Hochr.
Phragmocarpidium Krapov.
Radyera Bullock
Rojasimalva Fryxell
Senra Cav.
Symphyochlamys Gürke
Talipariti Fryxell
Urena L.
Wercklea Pittier & Standl.

References

External links

 
Rosid tribes